Jesús Eduardo Zavala Castañeda (born 21 July 1987) is a Mexican former professional footballer who played as a defensive midfielder.

Club career

Monterrey
Zavala made his debut with Monterrey in the Clausura 2006 against Toluca. He began playing as a forward, subsequently being moved to the midfield by Víctor Manuel Vucetich.<ref>[http://espndeportes.espn.go.com/news/story?id=1589237&s=mex&type=story Vucetich no acepta la idea de La Volpe – espn deportes]</ref>

Club Puebla
Club Puebla announced in the beginning of January 2019, that they had signed Zavala.

International career
After having an exceptional tournament with Monterrey where he helped the team win the Apertura 2010, Zavala appeared in the first list of Mexico coach, José Manuel de la Torre. He eventually played in the 2011 Gold Cup, including the final against the United States where Mexico won 4–2. He scored his first goal on June 12, 2012, against El Salvador.

Career statistics
International

International goalsScores and results list Mexico's goal tally first.''

Honours
Monterrey
Mexican Primera División: Apertura 2009, Apertura 2010
Copa MX: Apertura 2017
InterLiga: 2010
CONCACAF Champions League: 2010–11, 2011–12, 2012–13

Mexico U23
Pan American Games: 2011

Mexico
CONCACAF Gold Cup: 2011

References

External links
Team profile 
 

1987 births
Living people
Footballers from Nuevo León
C.F. Monterrey players
Liga MX players
Footballers at the 2011 Pan American Games
2011 CONCACAF Gold Cup players
2013 FIFA Confederations Cup players
CONCACAF Gold Cup-winning players
Sportspeople from Monterrey
Association football defenders
Pan American Games gold medalists for Mexico
Pan American Games medalists in football
Mexico international footballers
Medalists at the 2011 Pan American Games
Mexican footballers